Krbune, also called Cherbune, is a small hamlet in Istria County, Croatia. It is located in the plains of Arsa which is called Valley of Cherbune. Within the hamlet stands the little chapel with a small cemetery named San Martino constructed in the 15th century.

References

Populated places in Istria County